Half Moon Lake is a lake in Berrien County, in the U.S. state of Michigan.

Half Moon Lake was so named on account of its crescent-shaped outline.

References

Lakes of Berrien County, Michigan